William Otter (23 October 1768 – 20 August 1840) was the first Principal of King's College, London, who later served as Bishop of Chichester.

Early life
William Otter was born at Cuckney, Nottinghamshire on 23 October 1768, the son of Dorothy (née Wright) Otter (d. 1772) and the Rev. Edward Otter. He was educated at Jesus College, Cambridge, where he was later made a fellow.

Career

He was appointed Principal of the newly established King's College, London, in 1831, and held the post until 1836 when he was appointed Bishop of Chichester. Otter established a small college to train schoolmasters in 1840, which was rebuilt in his memory in 1849 as Bishop Otter College, now the main Bishop Otter Campus of the University of Chichester.

Personal life
On 3 July 1804, he married Nancy Sadleir Bruère in Leatherhead, Surrey. Nancy was a granddaughter of George Bruere, British Governor of Bermuda. Together, they had three sons and five daughters:

 The Ven. William Bruère Otter (1805–1876), the Archdeacon of Lewes who married Elizabeth Melvil (1814–1892).
 Sophia Otter (1807–1889), who married the Reverend Henry Malthus (1805–1882), son of Thomas Robert Malthus.
 Caroline Charlotte Otter (1809–1855), who married John Romilly, 1st Baron Romilly.
 Jacqueline Elizabeth Otter (1811–1849), who married Alexander Trotter, a banker and stockbroker at Coutts Bank. After her death, he married Isabella Strange, a daughter of Sir Thomas Strange.
 Maria Otter (b. 1814), who married Sir William Milbourne James, Lord Justice of Appeal. 
 Alfred William Otter (1815–1866), who married Anna Louisa de la Hooke (1824–1907).
 Amelia Harriet Otter (1817–1890), who married Edward Strutt, 1st Baron Belper.
 Reginald William Ongley Otter (1826–1862)

Otter died on 20 August 1840.

Descendants
His eldest son William had four sons and six daughters, including Lt. William Otter RN (1840–1870), and was the grandfather of Hugh Otter-Barry, Bishop of Mauritius. Through his son Alfred, he was a grandfather of Gen. William Dillon Otter.

Through his daughter Jacqueline, he was a grandfather of Coutts Trotter (1837–1887), Vice Master of Trinity College, Cambridge, Edward Bush Trotter (1842–1920), Archdeacon of Western Downs, Australia, Col. Sir Henry Trotter.  Through his daughter Maria, he was a grandfather of Maj. William Christopher James, who married Effie Gray Millais (the daughter of Effie Gray and John Everett Millais).

References
Notes

Sources

1768 births
1840 deaths
Alumni of Jesus College, Cambridge
Fellows of Jesus College, Cambridge
Principals of King's College London
Bishops of Chichester
People associated with the University of Chichester
19th-century Church of England bishops